Shayon Green (born July 9, 1991) is an American football player who plays as a Defensive Line. He played college football at the University of Miami from 2009 to 2013.

Early years
Green attended Tift County High School in Tifton, Georgia. He was Rated No. 65 weakside defensive end prospect in nation by Rivals.com. As a junior, he played defensive end and had 60 tackles, 8 sacks and 1 interception. As a senior, he had 125 tackles, 2 sacks and 5 forced fumbles. Green committed to the University of Miami to play college football.

College career
Green played at Miami from 2009 to 2013.

College Football Awards and honors 
 Captain's award (2013)
 Melching leadership award (2013)
 Defensive Most Valuable Player (2012)
 ACC's Brian Piccolo AwardCo-Winner (2012)

Professional career 
Coming out of college, Green was considered a "Prospect Worth Watching" by Dane Brugler. He was rated the 61 best defensive end out of the 162 available by NFLDraftScout.com. Although undrafted the Miami Dolphins agreed to sign him as a free agents in 2014. He attended Miami's Pro Day on 04/03/2014 where he ran the 40 yard dash in 4.58, Vertical Jump 29.5, 225 Lb. Bench Reps 34, 3-Cone Drill 7.49, and Broad Jump 09'01". Green was later signed by the Pittsburgh Steelers on Thursday April 2, 2015 where he played throughout the preseason and recorded 11 tackles 10 solo and 1 force fumble. Green was waived by the Steelers on September 5 and was picked up by the Winnipeg Blue Bombers in 2016, where he concluded the season with 22 tackles, 3 sacks and 1 interception.

References 

1991 births
Living people
American football defensive tackles
American football defensive ends
Miami Hurricanes football players
Pittsburgh Steelers players
Winnipeg Blue Bombers
People from Tifton, Georgia
Players of American football from Georgia (U.S. state)